Tingena hoplodesma is a species of moth in the family Oecophoridae. It is endemic to New Zealand and has been found in the North and South Islands. T. hoplodesma prefers native beech forest habitat and adults are on the wing from January to March.

Taxonomy 

This species was first described by Edward Meyrick in 1883 using specimens collected at South Rakaia in March by W. H. Gaze. Meyrick originally named the species Oecophora hoplodesma. Meyrick went on to give a fuller description of the species in 1884. In 1915 Meyrick placed this species within the Borkhausenia genus. In 1926 Alfred Philpott studied the genitalia of the male of this species. In that publication Philpott also synonymised Borkhausenia thranias with Borkhausenia hoplodesma. George Hudson discussed this species under the name Borkhausenia hoplodesma in his 1928 publication The butterflies and moths of New Zealand. In 1988 J. S. Dugdale placed this species in the genus Tingena. The male holotype specimen is held at the Natural History Museum, London.

Description 

Meyrick originally described this species as follows:

Meyrick went on to describe the species in more detail as follows:
The grey bands of this species are variable, with some specimens having indistinct bands or them even being absent or sometimes replaced with grey speckling.

Distribution

This species is endemic to New Zealand and has occurred in Whangārei, Kapiti Island, Nelson, Rakaia, Prices Valley, Canterbury, Dunedin and Lake Wakatipu.

Behaviour 
The adults of this species are on the wing between January and March.

Habitat 
T. hoplodesma prefers native beech forest habitat.

References

Oecophoridae
Moths of New Zealand
Moths described in 1883
Endemic fauna of New Zealand
Taxa named by Edward Meyrick
Endemic moths of New Zealand